The 1977 Grand Prix motorcycle racing season was the 29th F.I.M. Road Racing World Championship season.

Season summary
Suzuki saw off a strong challenge from Yamaha to take their second consecutive 500cc crown. Angel Nieto made it three 50cc titles in a row on a Bultaco while Morbidelli would win an impressive double world championship in the 125cc and 250cc divisions. Pier Paolo Bianchi successfully defended his 125cc title while fellow countryman Mario Lega captured the 250cc championship for the tiny Italian concern. The 350cc crown went to Takazumi Katayama on a special three cylinder Yamaha built in Holland, making him the first-ever Japanese world champion. Barry Sheene made it two premier titles in a row, winning from two Americans, Steve Baker and Pat Hennen.

The season was marred by numerous fatal accidents, including a terrible crash at the 350cc Austrian Grand Prix that claimed the life of Swiss rider, Hans Stadelmann and seriously injuring Johnny Cecotto, Patrick Fernandez, Dieter Braun and Franco Uncini. The accident led to a rider's strike in the 500 class, although organizers pressed on with Jack Findlay winning from a reduced field of competitors. Braun decided to end his riding career after recovering from his injuries.

In addition to this incident, the Yugoslavian Grand Prix at the notorious Opatija Circuit was also stricken by tragedy. After having been issued an ultimatum by the FIM, the Yugoslavian race organizers failed to take action to improve the safety of the circuit – which was notorious for its numerous road-side hazards including solid rock walls and steep, barely protected drop offs. The event was a disaster with Italian rider, Giovanni Ziggiotto, crashing during practice for the 250cc race when his motorcycle's engine seized and he was hit from behind by Per-Edward Carlson. He died four days later in a hospital. During the 50 cc race, Ulrich Graf crashed when his bike developed a rear tire puncture and he was thrown into a stone wall. He suffered serious head injuries and died later in a hospital. The Opatija Circuit was never used again for any kind of racing and, the Yugoslavian Grand Prix was moved to the nearby Rijeka permanent circuit.

Despite finishing second in the 500cc championship and winning the Formula 750 title, Baker would be released by Yamaha at the end of the year. Giacomo Agostini would retire after the season, ending his seventeen-year career with a record 122 Grand Prix victories and 15 World Championships.

1977 Grand Prix season calendar

Participants

500cc participants

Final standings

500cc standings

350cc standings

250cc standings

125cc standings

50cc standings

See also
 1977 Formula 750 season

Notes

References

Sources
 Büla, Maurice & Schertenleib, Jean-Claude (2001). Continental Circus 1949–2000. Chronosports S.A. 

Grand Prix motorcycle racing seasons